The Ghost of the Rancho is a 1918 American silent Western film directed by William Worthington and starring Bryant Washburn, Rhea Mitchell and Joseph J. Dowling.

Cast
 Bryant Washburn as Jeffrey Wall 
 Rhea Mitchell as Mary Drew 
 Joseph J. Dowling as Jeffrey's Grandfather

References

External links
 

1918 films
1918 Western (genre) films
American black-and-white films
Films directed by William Worthington
Pathé Exchange films
Silent American Western (genre) films
1910s English-language films
1910s American films